Cellana denticulata, or the denticulate limpet, is a species of true limpet, a marine gastropod mollusc in the family Nacellidae, one of the families of true limpets. It is endemic to New Zealand.

References

Further reading
 Powell A. W. B. New Zealand Mollusca. William Collins Publishers Ltd, Auckland 1979 
 Nakano T. & Ozawa T. (2007). Worldwide phylogeography of limpets of the order Patellogastropoda: molecular, morphological and paleontological evidence. Journal of Molluscan Studies 73(1): 79–99

Nacellidae
Gastropods of New Zealand
Endemic fauna of New Zealand
Gastropods described in 1784
Endemic molluscs of New Zealand